Krvavac is a village in the Kula Norinska municipality.

Demographics

Architecture and parish 

The parish was created by the Yugoslav Ministry of Religion on 5 August 1921, by dividing the parish Desne-Bagalovići.

Parish church of Our Lady of Carmel Bagalović 
The 20.7x8 metre church was built in Bagalović in 1865 in place of the older chapel built in 1790. It was financed by the pastors and the government in Zadar. It was built with improperly cut stone. During the time of pastor Mirko Bašićin 1926, a belfry with three bells was built. It was renovated in 1991 when Stjepan Barišić was pastor.

Church of Saint Martin of Porers 
The 10x6.15 meter church is located in the place of the former church tavern. When Barišić was pastor in 1997, a belfry was constructed, and the roof renovated.

Education 
A volksschule was opened on 7 October 1922, as the 20th school in the then Metković kotar(district). The first teacher was Urica Batinović from Opuzen.

References

External links 

Populated places in Dubrovnik-Neretva County